The 1894 Michigan gubernatorial election was held on November 6, 1894. Incumbent Republican John T. Rich defeated Democratic candidate Spencer O. Fisher with 56.89% of the vote.

General election

Candidates
Major party candidates
John T. Rich, Republican
Spencer O. Fisher, Democratic
Other candidates
Alva W. Nichols, People's
Albert M. Todd, Prohibition

Results

References

1894
Michigan
Gubernatorial
November 1894 events